Hash Kanjee (born 27 December 1950) is a Canadian former field hockey player.

References

1950 births
Living people
Canadian male field hockey players
Pan American Games medalists in field hockey
Pan American Games silver medalists for Canada
Field hockey players at the 1979 Pan American Games
Field hockey players at the 1991 Pan American Games
Medalists at the 1979 Pan American Games
Medalists at the 1991 Pan American Games